Steve Georgallis (Greek: Στυλιανός Γεωργάλλης; born 17 June 1968) is a Greek professional rugby league football coach who is the head coach of Greece, an assistant coach for the North Queensland Cowboys in the NRL and former professional rugby league footballer.

As a coach, he has served as interim head coach for the Penrith Panthers and Canterbury-Bankstown Bulldogs.

Playing career
Georgallis made his début with Eastern Suburbs in 1989 playing .

Joining Western Suburbs in 1993, he proved just as adaptable, and was a cornerstone of the team for 7 seasons, playing in 148 games. During this time he also spent an off-season in England playing for Wakefield Trinity. He played a season mostly from the bench for the Wests Tigers after the merger with Balmain. He was cheered from the field at the completion of his last Australian game.

In 2001, Georgallis joined the Warrington Wolves for a season. Wolves' coach Darryl van der Velde said at the time, "He knows what Rugby League's all about. He is very strong, has good hands and is always busy on the field." Unfortunately, Georgallis only lasted 6 games before the end of his professional career, though he did make later appearances as captain of Greece.

Coaching career
In 2003, Georgallis became the head coach of the Greece national rugby league team and the Western Suburbs Magpies SG Ball Cup team. On 31 August 2003, he coached Greece in their first rugby league Test match, a 26–10 win over New Caledonia in Sydney. In 2004, he became head coach of the Magpies NSWRL Premier League team.

In 2006, Georgallis joined the Penrith Panthers as an assistant coach and head coach of their NSWRL Premier League feeder club, the St Marys Cougars. In 2008, he became coach of Penrith's National Youth Competition under-20s team, finishing fourth and taking them to the finals. 

On 20 June 2011, it was announced that Georgallis would take over as interim head coach of the Penrith Panthers following the resignation of Matthew Elliott. He had immediate success, defeating the North Queensland Cowboys 30–20 in his first game in charge. Georgallis had won his first two games when it was announced that Phil Gould had chosen Ivan Cleary to be the Penrith coach from 2012 onwards. The Penrith club won just two of the remaining nine games of the season.

In 2012, Georgallis joined his former club, the Wests Tigers, as an assistant coach. In 2014, Georgallis joined the Manly Warringah Sea Eagles as an assistant coach, spending two years at the club. In 2016, he re-joined Penrith as the club's NSW Cup head coach.

On 15 December 2016, Georgallis was named as head coach of the Canterbury-Bankstown Bulldogs for the 2017 season. Georgallis led the side to a Top 4 finish and a finals appearance. On 26 October 2017, he was promoted to assistant coach of the Canterbury NRL side while remaining as their NSW Cup head coach.

In 2018, Georgallis led Canterbury-Bankstown to Intrust Super Premiership and the NRL State Championship victories. On 6 November 2018, he was named as an assistant coach of Canterbury-Bankstown on a full-time basis.

In November 2019, Georgallis' Greece side qualified for the 2021 Rugby League World Cup, the country's first Rugby League World Cup qualification.

On 14 July 2020, following Canterbury's Round 9 loss to the Brisbane Broncos, Georgallis was named as the club's interim head coach for the remainder of the 2020 NRL season, following Dean Pay's resignation. In Round 11, Georgallis earned his first win as Canterbury-Bankstown head coach, defeating the Newcastle Knights 18–12 in his second game in charge. In Round 19, Canterbury-Bankstown defeated South Sydney 26–16, helping them to avoid the wooden spoon. Following the appointment of Trent Barrett as Canterbury head coach for the 2021 NRL season, Georgallis left the club. 

On 30 October 2020, Georgallis joined the North Queensland Cowboys as an assistant coach under head coach Todd Payten.
Georgallis coached Greece at the 2021 Rugby League World Cup where they lost all three of their group matches including a 94-4 defeat against England.

References

Sources

External links

Staff at penrith.panthers.com.au
Rooster Rigon now a Bull
Warrington stun Leeds
Woodsy on… Warrington Wolves

1968 births
Living people
Australian people of Greek descent
Australian expatriate sportspeople in England
Greek rugby league players
Greek expatriate sportspeople in England
Australian rugby league coaches
Australian rugby league players
Canterbury-Bankstown Bulldogs coaches
Carlisle RLFC players
Greece national rugby league team coaches
Penrith Panthers coaches
Rugby league five-eighths
Rugby league halfbacks
Rugby league locks
Rugby league players from Sydney
Sydney Roosters players
Wakefield Trinity players
Warrington Wolves players
Western Suburbs Magpies players
Wests Tigers players
Australian expatriate rugby league players